Chris Tse (born 19 June 1989) (Chinese name: 謝聖文) is a Canadian spoken-word poet, motivational speaker, and hip hop artist of Chinese descent. A former speaker for Me to We, he has toured extensively with the Kenyan Boys Choir and in We Days across Canada.

Born in Vancouver and raised in Coquitlam, British Columbia, Tse attended Carleton University in Ottawa where he received his bachelor's degree in journalism. He began performing spoken-word in his second year of his undergraduate studies. In 2009, he won the Vancouver poetry slam with his poem I'm Sorry I'm a Christian, and in the following year he won the Capital Slam championship in Ottawa. He went on to captain the Capital Slam team to victory in the national championship. Since then, he has performed across Canada, the United States, Europe, Asia, and Ghana in various slams as a featured poet. He has given performances twice with TED and has also made an appearance at SPEAKout. In 2011 Tse represented Canada at the Poetry Slam World Cup in Paris and won second place.

Besides spoken word, Tse has worked in Ghana as a human rights reporter with Journalists for Human Rights. In 2016, he resigned from his speaker and leadership facilitator roles at Me to We. He is also the founder of the blog Fish With legs.

With a passion for Social Justice and his work as a speaker for Youth, Tse remarks: I’ve always been social-justice minded. Growing up in Coquitlam, it wasn’t a rough upbringing, but every city has its issues and some friends from high school did end up doing drugs and getting involved in gangs. My parents raised me to learn about the world and see the disparity that exists.

Bibliography
Ode to My Afro - Selected works
Ode to My Afro - Audio recordings of selected works

Notable poems
I'm Sorry I'm a Christian
Railroad
Greatness
My McDonald's Girl
Wake Up
Euthanasia for the Youth in Asia
Jobs
Sine Metu (for Jameson Whiskey)

See also

Slam poetry

References

1989 births
Canadian people of Chinese descent
21st-century Canadian poets
Canadian male poets
Canadian spoken word poets
Living people
Slam poets
People from Coquitlam
Writers from Vancouver
21st-century Canadian male writers